Khrystyna Stoloka Ukrainian: Христина Столока born on 21 July 1997 in Kyiv Ukraine) is a Ukrainian model and beauty pageant titleholder who was crowned Miss Ukraine 2015 and represented her country at the Miss World 2015.

Early life
Stoloka was born and raised in the capital city of Ukraine, Kyiv. She is a student of the National University of Food Technologies in Kyiv, and a model.

Pageantry

Miss Ukraine 2015
Stoloka was crowned as Miss Ukraine 2015 at Kyiv International Center of Culture and Arts on September 22, 2015. She was one of the 26 contestants participating on the final round of the contest.

Miss World 2015
Stoloka represented her country at Miss World 2015.

References

External links
 Main site 

1997 births
Living people
Ukrainian beauty pageant winners
Ukrainian female models
Miss World 2015 delegates